Corner of Madrid (Spanish:Rinconcito madrileño) is a 1936 Spanish drama film directed by León Artola. The film was made at the Estudios Roptence in Madrid.

Cast
 Pilar Cantero    
 María Cañete   
 Guadalupe Garcí-Nuño
 Ana de Leyva
 Luis Prendes   
 Cecilio Rodríguez de la Vega  
 Trini Tejada  
 Pepita C. Velázquez

References

Bibliography
 Labanyi, Jo & Pavlović, Tatjana. A Companion to Spanish Cinema. John Wiley & Sons, 2012.

External links 

1936 films
Spanish drama films
1936 drama films
1930s Spanish-language films
Films set in Madrid
Spanish black-and-white films